Uno (English: One) is the sixth studio album by Chilean rock band La Ley, released on February 21, 2000 by Warner Music Group.

Content

Recording 

This was the first album released by the band after the departure of Rodrigo Aboitiz and Luciano Rojas. The band went on to record this studio album as a trio, with the addition of guest Archie Frugone to record the bass tracks.

Touring bassist J.C. Cumplido returned to tour with them until his departure from the lineup in 2001. Cumplido was replaced by Archie Frugone for the remainder of the tour and beyond.

Style 

Stylistically, this album was seen as a departure from the darker, more electro-industrial style of Vértigo, and the grunge-fused goth style of Invisible, adopting a more straightforward Alternative Rock sound with fewer experimental ambient sounds.

The song “Amor y Fe” goes back to the band’s original new wave sound, and can be traced back to 1990, when the band was in the studio for the Desiertos sessions, ultimately being re-recorded for this album. To date, it is the last contribution from Andrés Bobe on any of the band’s material, as the song was written with Bobe before his passing.

Commercial performance

The album was a breakthrough success in the United States, effectively establishing the band’s fan base in that country, ultimately winning the Grammy Award for Best Latin Rock/Alternative Album and reaching #41 on the Billboard Top Latin Albums.

Five singles were spawned from this album, with "Aquí", "Fuera de mí", and "Eternidad” receiving considerable airplay.

Track listing 
"Eternidad" (Beto Cuevas, Pedro Frugone) - 4:09
"Tierra" (Cuevas, Frugone, Mauricio Clavería) - 4:16
"Aquí" (Cuevas, Aldo Nova) - 4:45
"Fuera de Mí" (Cuevas, Nova) - 4:56
"Delirando" (Cuevas, Claveria, Frugone, Nova) - 3:45
"Amor y Fe" (Andrés Bobe, Cuevas) - 4:33
"Paraíso" (Cuevas) - 3:46
"Ritual" (Cuevas, Frugone, Clavería) - 4:04
"Verano Espacial" (Cuevas) - 3:52
"Al Final" (Cuevas, Claveria, Frugone, Nova) - 10:40
 The song "Al Final" ends at 5:10. The hidden track "Once in a Lifetime" starts at 7:35, after 2 minutes and 25 seconds of silence.

Sales and certifications

References

External links 
 Official site

2000 albums
La Ley (band) albums
Grammy Award for Best Latin Rock, Urban or Alternative Album